John Manley (born 1950) is a British archaeologist and author. His book AD 43, published by Tempus in 2002, is the first to give serious consideration to the archaeological evidence for the Roman invasion of Britain having taken place via alternative routes (as opposed to the traditional view of Richborough in Kent as the main landing-place).

Manley was educated at the universities of Manchester and Sussex, and has excavated throughout Europe, as well as in the Near East, Africa and the Caribbean. He was formerly County Archaeologist of Clwyd and Chief Executive of the Sussex Archaeological Society. He is currently an Hon. Research Fellow and a Trustee of the Sussex Archaeological Society.

Publications 
 Atlas of Prehistoric Britain, Phaidon, 1989 
 The Archaeology of Clwyd, with Stephen Grenter and Fiona Gale, Clwyd County Council, 1991 
 The Atlas of Past Worlds: a comparative chronology of human history 2000 BC – AD 1500, Cassell, 1993 
 AD 43: The Roman Invasion of Britain: a reassessment, Tempus, 2002 
 Facing the Palace: excavations in front of the Roman Palace at Fishbourne, 1995–99, with David Rudkin, Lewes, 2005
 The  Archaeology of Fishbourne and Chichester: a framework for its future, Lewes, 2008 
 The Archaeology of the South Downs National Park: An Introduction, Lewes, 2012 
 South Downs: Archaeological Walking Guides, History Press, 2013 
 The Romans, Hodder, 2013 
 Archaeology, Hodder, 2014 
 Secrets of the High Woods: revealing hidden landscapes (editor), South Downs National Park Authority, 2016

References

External links
 

1950 births
Living people
British archaeologists
Historians of Roman Britain